Philip Ellis may refer to:
Philip Ellis (priest) (1822–1900), Welsh clergyman
Philip Michael Ellis (1652–1726), English bishop of Segni
Philip Ellis (racing driver) (born 1992), German racing driver
Philip Ellis Wheelwright (1901–1970), American philosopher

See also